Aura is the eighth studio album by British progressive rock band Asia. As a result of the diverse array of guest musicians, Aura had a wide mix of sounds with some songs trying to replicate Asia's earlier style, while others retained the more acoustic Latin production started by Arena five years prior.

Production
Aura began recording in 1999 at Loco Studios located in the village of Llanhennock in Monmouthshire, Wales. The group had gotten reduced to the duo of singer-songwriter John Payne and musician Geoff Downes by this time, and they were determined to create a new sort of supergroup around Aura by bringing in multiple guest artists to collaborate with them. Examples include Tony Levin, Elliott Randall, and Chris Slade. Original member Steve Howe even featured on the songs "The Last Time" and "Free". It was produced by the band itself alongside Simon Hanhart, an audio engineer who had previously produced work by groups such as Babylon A.D., Saxon, and Whitecross. A stable line-up would eventually be established from this, with guitarist Guthrie Govan and drummer Chris Slade becoming mainstays until 2006.

The lyrics for "Awake" were adapted from "The Rubaiyat" of Omar Khayyam. The lyrics for "The Longest Night" were inspired by Wilfred Owen's poem of 1918. "Ready to Go Home" was written by Andrew Gold and Graham Gouldman of 10cc and appeared on Mirror Mirror (1995).

Geoff Downes had mixed feelings about the album's production. He stated "It was good to start with, but I think because of the duration of the album - at the end of it we felt it had gone in a slightly different direction than we wanted it to. In hindsight, sometimes these things happen."

The cover artwork was designed by Roger Dean, who had collaborated with Asia since their inception.

Release
Aura was originally meant to release in August 2000, but scheduling conflicts with Recognition Records pushed it back to January 31, 2001, initially available in Japan before coming to the UK on February 12. The album had numerous editions, including the standard jewel case CD issue, a limited Digipak CD edition with three bonus tracks, and a limited vinyl release. In the United States, the album was issued by Windstorm Records, a division of Blue Storm Music, and also included the three bonus tracks. In 2007, Aura was re-issued by Acadia, a label of Evangeline Records. This added a bonus CD which featured an acoustic performance by Steve Howe, recorded live at the Chestnut Cabaret in Philadelphia on 21 November 1992. "Wherever You Are" was released as a promotional single, backed with "Under the Gun", which both received some airplay. Two songs originally written for the album, "Never the Way" and "Innocence" were included on Armada 1, the band's first fan club exclusive EP released in 2002.

Reception 
Although the sound of Aura can be described as radio-friendly, it did not perform well in charts and remains one of the least sold studio recording in the group's catalog. This may have been partly due to Recognition Records, which went bankrupt within a year after the album was released.

Critically, Aura received generally positive reviews. Dave Ling wrote in his review for Classic Rock magazine: "Among the standouts is Ready to Go Home, a beautifully restrained track written by Andrew Gold and 10cc's Graham Gouldman. But consistency is the album's key, and Awake, You're the Stranger, The Last Time, and the yearning The Longest Night are all songs from the very top drawer. Musically, Downes and Payne have chosen their contributors well. They seem to have an intuitive awareness of which players would fit certain songs." Conversely, the magazine Wonderous Stories wrote "From the excellent opener Awake, where Geoff and John are joined by Michael Sturgis again on drums, through the concluding title track, the album is full of strengths and no weaknesses in sight."    Christopher Thelen of The Daily Vault was more ambivalent towards the album. While noting that the amount of guest musicians made the album lack cohesion, he cited the tracks "Forgive Me" and "Free" as highlights.

Track listing

Personnel

Asia
 John Payne – lead vocals, bass, guitar
 Geoff Downes – keyboards

Additional musicians
 Neil Lockwood – backing vocals
 Gary Liederman – bass

"Awake"
 Guthrie Govan – guitars
 Michael Sturgis – drums
 Luis Jardim – percussion
 David Grant's Gospel Choir – choir

"Wherever You Are"
 Guthrie Govan – guitars
 Chris Slade – drums

"Ready to Go Home"
 Guthrie Govan – guitars
 Tony Levin – bass
 Vinnie Colaiuta – drums
 Luis Jardim – percussion
 David Grant's Gospel Choir – choir

"The Last Time"
 Steve Howe – guitars
 Ian Crichton – guitars
 Vinnie Colaiuta – drums
 Luis Jardim – percussion

"Forgive Me"
 Guthrie Govan – guitars
 Michael Sturgis – drums
 Luis Jardim – percussion

"Kings of the Day"
 Guthrie Govan – guitars
 Simon Phillips – drums
 Luis Jardim – percussion

"On the Coldest Day in Hell"
 Guthrie Govan – guitars
 Michael Sturgis – drums

"Free"
 Steve Howe – guitars
 Ian Crichton – guitars
 Pat Thrall – guitars
 Simon Phillips – drums

"You're the Stranger"
 Elliott Randall – guitars
 Guthrie Govan – guitars
 Michael Sturgis – drums
 Luis Jardim – percussion

"The Longest Night"
 Guthrie Govan – guitars
 Vinnie Colaiuta – drums

"Aura"
 Elliott Randall – guitars
 Michael Sturgis – drums
 Luís Jardim – percussion

"Under the Gun"
 Ian Crichton – guitars
 Chris Slade – drums

"Come Make My Day"
 Ian Crichton – guitars
 Chris Slade – drums

"Hands of Time"
 Ian Crichton – guitars
 Chris Slade – drums

Technical personnel
 Simon Hanhart – producer, engineer, mixing engineer
 Ray Staff – mastering engineer (at Whitfield Studios, London)
 Roger Dean – painting, lettering
 Martyn Dean – booklet design

References

Asia (band) albums
2001 albums
Albums with cover art by Roger Dean (artist)